Freddie Swain (born August 4, 1998) is an American football wide receiver for the Miami Dolphins of the National Football League (NFL). He played college football at Florida.

Early years
Swain attended North Marion High School, where he was a consensus four-star recruit and fielded scholarship offers from Alabama and Clemson before selecting Florida. As a return specialist, Swain returned 22 punts for 224 yards in 2018, including an 85-yard return for a touchdown. In 2019, he compiled 14 returns for 56 yards. Swain tallied 38 catches for 527 yards and a team-high seven touchdowns as a senior. In 47 career games, including 10 starts, Swain gained 1,387 all-purpose yards. He had 69 career receptions for 996 yards and 15 touchdowns.

College career
Swain totaled 68 receptions for 996 receiving yards and 15 receiving touchdowns in four seasons with the Florida Gators.

Professional career

Seattle Seahawks
Swain was selected by the Seattle Seahawks in the sixth round at No. 214 overall of the 2020 NFL draft.

Swain made his NFL debut in Week 1 against the Atlanta Falcons. During the game, Swain recovered a fumble lost by punt returner Sharrod Neasman in the 38–25 win. He caught his first pass for 17 yards in that game. In Swain's second game at home against the New England Patriots on Sunday Night Football, he caught his first touchdown for 21 yards thrown by Russell Wilson. In Week 14, in a home game against the New York Jets, Swain caught a 19 yard touchdown pass thrown by Wilson. On August 30, 2022, Swain was released by the Seahawks.

Miami Dolphins
On September 2, 2022, Swain was signed to the Miami Dolphins practice squad. On December 10, 2022, Swain was elevated to the active roster.

Denver Broncos
On December 13, 2022, Swain was signed by the Denver Broncos to their active roster. He was waived on March 14, 2023.

Miami Dolphins (second stint)
On March 15, 2023, the Miami Dolphins claimed Swain off waivers.

References

External links
Seattle Seahawks bio
Florida Gators bio

1998 births
Living people
American football wide receivers
Florida Gators football players
Miami Dolphins players
Players of American football from Florida
Seattle Seahawks players
Sportspeople from Ocala, Florida